Rainbow View (foaled 21 May 2006) is an American Thoroughbred racehorse who was trained by John Gosden to win the Fillies' Mile as a two-year-old and the Matron Stakes as a three-year-old. During her four-year-old season she was trained by Jonathan E. Sheppard and race solely in the United States.

She is the daughter of Jersey Derby winner Dynaformer and No Matter What, a daughter of Nureyev.

References

2006 racehorse births
Racehorses bred in Kentucky
Racehorses trained in the United Kingdom
Cartier Award winners
Thoroughbred family 17-b